Anti-Sovietism, anti-Soviet sentiment, called by Soviet authorities antisovetchina, refers to persons and activities actually or allegedly aimed against the Soviet Union or government power within the Soviet Union.

Three different flavors of the usage of the term may be distinguished:
 Anti-Sovietism in international politics, such as the Western opposition to the Soviet Union during the Cold War as part of broader anti-communism.
 Anti-Soviet opponents of the Bolsheviks shortly after the Russian Revolution and during the Russian Civil War.
 As applied to Soviet citizens (allegedly) involved in anti-government activities.

History

In the Soviet Union 

During the Russian Civil War that followed the October Revolution of 1917, the anti-Soviet side was the White movement. Between the wars, some resistance movement, particularly in the 1920s, was cultivated by Polish intelligence in the form of the Promethean project. After Germany's attack on the Soviet Union in 1941, anti-Soviet forces were created and led primarily by Nazi Germany (see Russian Liberation Movement). During the Cold War, the United States led the anti-Soviet and anti-communist democratic bloc.

In the time of the Russian Civil War, whole categories of people, such as clergy, kulaks and former Imperial Russian officers, were automatically considered anti-Soviet. More categories are listed in the article "Enemy of the people". Those who were deemed anti-Soviet in this way, because of their former social status, were often presumed guilty whenever tried for a crime.

The Soviet Union made extensive use of the term (vrag naroda) (literal meaning is the enemy of the people). The term was first used in a speech by Felix Dzerzhinsky, the first chairman of the Cheka, after the October Revolution. The Petrograd Military Revolutionary Committee printed lists of "enemies of the people", and Vladimir Lenin invoked it in his decree of 28 November 1917:

Other similar terms were in use as well:
enemy of the labourers (враг трудящихся, vrag trudyashchikhsya)
enemy of the proletariat (враг пролетариата, vrag proletariata)
class enemy (классовый враг, klassovyi vrag), etc.

In particular, the term "enemy of the workers" was formalized in the Article 58 (RSFSR Penal Code), and similar articles in the codes of the other Soviet Republics.

At various times these terms were applied, in particular, to Tsar Nicholas II and the Imperial family, aristocrats, the bourgeoisie, clerics, business entrepreneurs, anarchists, kulaks, monarchists, Mensheviks, Esers, Bundists, Trotskyists, Bukharinists, the "old Bolsheviks", the army and police, emigrants, saboteurs, wreckers (вредители, "vrediteli"), "social parasites" (тунеядцы, "tuneyadtsy"), Kavezhedists (people who administered and serviced the KVZhD (China Far East Railway), particularly the Russian population of Harbin, China), those considered bourgeois nationalists (notably Russian, Ukrainian, Belarusian, Armenian, Lithuanian, Latvian, Estonian nationalists, Zionists, Basmachi).

An "enemy of the people" could be imprisoned, expelled or executed, and lose their property to confiscation. Close relatives of enemies of the people were labeled as "traitor of Motherland family members" and prosecuted. They could be sent to Gulag, punished by the involuntary settlement in unpopulated areas, or stripped of citizen's rights. Being a friend of an enemy of the people automatically placed the person under suspicion.

A majority of the enemies of the people were given this label not because of their hostile actions against the workers' and peasants' state, but simply because of their social origin or profession before the revolution: those who used hired labor, high-ranking clergy, former policemen, merchants, etc. Some of them were commonly known as lishentsy (лишенцы, derived from Russian word лишение, deprivation), because by the Soviet Constitution they were deprived of the right of voting. This automatically translated into a deprivation of various social benefits; some of them, e.g., rationing, were at times critical for survival.

Since 1927, Article 20 of the Common Part of the penal code that listed possible "measures of social defence" had the following item 20a: "declaration to be an enemy of the workers with deprivation of the union republic citizenship and hence of the USSR citizenship, with obligatory expulsion from its territory". Nevertheless, most "enemies of the people" suffered labor camps, rather than expulsion.

Later in the Soviet Union, being anti-Soviet was a criminal offense, known as "Anti-Soviet agitation". The epithet "antisoviet" was synonymous with "counter-revolutionary". The noun "antisovietism" was rarely used and the noun "antisovietist" was used in a derogatory sense. Anti-Soviet agitation and activities were political crimes handled by the Article 58 and later Article 70 of the RSFSR penal code and similar articles in other Soviet republics. In February 1930, there was an anti-Soviet insurgency in the Kazak Autonomous Socialist Soviet Republic village of Sozak.

After the end of the Second World War, there were Eastern European anti-Communist insurgencies against the Soviet Union.

In Post-Soviet countries

Estonia 
In August 2022 Estonia began removing Soviet monuments, beginning with a T-34 tank in Narva, saying it was necessary for public order and internal security.

Latvia 

On 6 May 2022, following the Russian invasion of Ukraine, Latvian Prime Minister Krišjānis Kariņš announced that the removal of the controversial monument to the Red Army was inevitable. Five days later a public fundraising campaign was launched and more than 39,000 euros had been donated by 12 May when the Saeima voted to suspend the functioning of a section regarding the preservation of memorial structures in an agreement between Latvia and Russia. By 13 May, the total amount of donations had almost reached 200,000 euros.

A rally "Getting Rid of Soviet Heritage" taking place on March 20 was attended by approximately 5,000 people, while a counter rally by Latvian Russian Union was not allowed over security concerns.

A list of 93 street names still glorifying the Soviet regime (such as 13 streets named after the Pioneer movement), as well as 48 street names given during the Russification at the end of the 19th century (like streets named after Alexander Pushkin), has been compiled by historians of the Public Memory Center and sent to the corresponding municipalities who were recommended to change them.

See also 

 Anti-communism
 Anti-Soviet partisans
 Anti-Stalinist left
 Criticisms of communist party rule
 Enemy of the people
 German mistreatment of Soviet prisoners of war
 Red Scare
 Red Terror
 Soviet dissidents
 Soviet Empire
 Timeline of events in the Cold War
 Anti-Russian sentiment
 List of monuments and memorials removed following the Russian invasion of Ukraine

References 

Anti-communism
Political repression in the Soviet Union
Foreign relations of the Soviet Union
Anti-Soviet resistance